System I may refer to:

 IBM System i, a series of computer systems
 CCIR System I, an analogue broadcast television standard

See also 
 System One (disambiguation)
 System 1 (disambiguation)